Colonel Prince Yi Geon (October 28, 1909 – December 21, 1990), also Ri Ken and , was a Korean prince and a cavalry officer in the Imperial Japanese Army during World War II. The first son of Prince Yi Kang of Korea by Lady Jeong, he was a grandson of Emperor Gwangmu. His Korean name was Yi Geon (  I Geon), and his birth name was Yonggil ( Yonggil).

He was brought to Japan in 1918, and entered Gakushūin Primary School. In 1930, he was commissioned in the Imperial Japanese Army as a second lieutenant of cavalry. He was promoted to Lieutenant in 1932 and to Captain in 1936. He served as the instructor of horsemanship at the Imperial Military Academy. He received further promotions to Major in 1940, and to Lieutenant-Colonel in 1943. With the end of the Second World War in 1945, he concluded his military career with the rank of Colonel. He married , a maternal cousin of Princess Masako of Nashimoto and member of the Matsudaira clan, on October 5, 1931, in Tokyo. They had two sons and a daughter.

After World War II, he was not allowed to go back to Korea. After he lost royal status by order of the SCAP in October 1947, he was naturalized as a Japanese citizen in 1950. Then he changed his name to Kenichi Momoyama. In a blood test, Momoyama discovered that he was not the biological father of his eldest son, Yi Chun (이충), to which he believed that Yoshiko committed adultery back in 1932; eventually, he divorced with Yoshiko in May 1951 and only claimed the custody of his second son, Yi Ki (이기). In 1990 he died; Prince Mikasa attended his funeral.

References 

1909 births
1990 deaths
Japanese people of Korean descent
House of Yi
Korean nobility
Japanese military personnel of World War II
Korean collaborators with Imperial Japan
Japanese nobility
Naturalized citizens of Japan